Revelation is the thirteenth studio album by American rock band Journey, and their first with lead singer Arnel Pineda. It features 11 new songs ("Faith in the Heartland" was previously recorded with Steve Augeri), 11 re-recorded greatest hits (all featuring Pineda) and a DVD (North American version only) featuring the current lineup's March 8, 2008 concert in Las Vegas, Nevada. Three singles penned by Neal Schon and Jonathan Cain were released to radio: the distinctively Journey-sounding "Never Walk Away," "Where Did I Lose Your Love," and the power ballad "After All These Years". "Where Did I Lose Your Love" and "After All These Years" both found success on the adult contemporary charts; "Where Did I Lose Your Love" peaked at No. 19, while "After All These Years" peaked at No. 9 on Billboards Adult Contemporary chart and stayed on the charts for over 23 weeks.

On May 14, 2008, MelodicRock.com reported that Journey and Frontiers Records agreed to add "an exclusive original bonus track, "Let It Take You Back", a mid-tempo rocker, to the European release to close the album.

Production
Revelation was recorded throughout early 2008 at The Plant in Sausalito, California by John Neff.

The album was released in the U.S. on June 3, 2008 by Nomota LLC (Schon's personal recording label) exclusively through Wal-Mart, and in Europe on June 6, 2008 through Frontiers Records. In addition, Wal-Mart also released a limited-edition ZVUE 1-gigabyte MP3 player pre-loaded with discs 1–2 of Revelation.

The album was produced by Kevin Shirley, who also produced Trial by Fire and Arrival.

Reception
On its first week of release, Revelation sold over 105,000 copies, marking a 1,400% increase over the first week sales of the band's 2005 release Generations. The album debuted at No. 1 on Billboard'''s Independent Albums chart, No. 2 on Billboard Rock Album chart, and No. 5 on the Billboard 200, where it remained for 42 weeks. The album was not only a huge success in the United States, but also reached the charts in 9 different countries.Revelation was nominated for Album of the Year in Classic Rock Magazines annual poll.

On December 18, 2008, the album was certified platinum by the RIAA, making it Journey's first such certification since their 1996 album Trial by Fire. According to Nielsen Soundscan, Revelation has sold more than 1,000,000 copies in the U.S. as of November 2009.

Track listing

DVD
"Sky Light" (N. Schon)
"Any Way You Want It" 
"Wheel in the Sky" 
"Lights"
"After All These Years" 
"Never Walk Away" 
"Open Arms (Prelude)" (Cain)
"Open Arms" 
"Mother, Father" (Perry, Matt Schon, N. Schon, Cain) (from Escape, 1981, Deen Castronovo on lead vocals)
"Wildest Dream" 
"Separate Ways (Worlds Apart)"
"Faithfully" 
"Don't Stop Believin'" 
"Be Good to Yourself"

PersonnelJourneyNeal Schon – all guitars, backing vocals
Jonathan Cain – keyboards, backing vocals
Ross Valory – bass, backing vocals
Deen Castronovo – drums, backing vocals
Arnel Pineda – lead vocalsProduction'''
Kevin Shirley – producer, mixing
John Neff – engineer
Justin Pintar – mixing assistant
George Marino – mastering
Dave Skaff – FOH Mix-Tracking Engineer

Charts

Weekly charts

Year-end charts

Singles

Certifications

Release history

References

2008 albums
2008 remix albums
Journey (band) albums
Journey (band) video albums
Albums produced by Kevin Shirley
Frontiers Records albums
King Records (Japan) albums
Kakao M albums